Bedford Public Schools is a school district in  Bedford, Massachusetts, United States.  Once encompassing 5 elementary schools, a junior high and high school, has since made changes to system layout.  From 1979 to 1989, they have closed two elementary schools, and restructured which schools students attend for certain grades.  In recent years, The Davis School was completely rebuilt next to the former building, and The Job Lane School and the Bedford High School received additions increasing the capacity of those buildings.

Schools
Bedford High School Grades 9–12; Also serves High School pupils from Hanscom Air Force Base
John Glenn Middle School (Formerly John Glenn Junior High School, Bedford Junior High School; Formerly grades 7 & 8) Grades 6-8 (named for a previous school superintendent, not the former Senator and astronaut)
Lt. Job Lane Elementary School (Formerly grades K-6) Grades 3-5
Lt. Eleazer Davis Elementary School (Formerly grades K-6) Grades K-2
Center Elementary School (Closed 1979; Grades K-6)
Nathaniel Page School (Closed c. 1982; Grades K-6) (Formally Grades 1–5 with grade 6 sent to the Job Lane School)

References

External links
Bedford Public Schools

School districts in Massachusetts
Education in Middlesex County, Massachusetts